King's Meaburn is a small village and civil parish in Cumbria, England. The river flows just to the west of the village, and was crossed by a ford on the road to Newby and Morland. At the 2001 census the parish had a population of 105, increasing to 135 at the 2011 Census.

The village is known for its annual Beer Festival at The White Horse.

History

King's Meaburn was thought to be an Anglo-Saxon settlement in the 7th and 8th centuries. This idea is reinforced by the fact that Meaburn is an Anglo-Saxon name. The name is derived from "Meadburn", which means "meadow by a stream".

The name King's Meaburn goes back to the 12th century. The King at the time, Henry II, gave part of the village's lands to Sir Hugh de Morville, and the other part to his sister, Maud de Veteripont. Sir Hugh eventually fell out of favour with the King, after which the King reclaimed Sir Hugh's section of the land, and hence the name King's Meaburn. The land that belonged to Maud was and to this day (September 2008) is called Maulds Meaburn.

One notable event in the village was in 1745 when Charles Edward Stuart aka Bonnie Prince Charlie and some of his soldiers crossed the ford in the village on their way to rendezvous with more of his troops in Shap.

Geography and Weather

Due to the village's position relative to the nearby mountains, the village can be subject to strong winds known as the Helm Wind.

Churches

Churches in King's Meaburn include St Mary's, the Wesleyan Chapel and the New Methodist Church.

Watermill
Steele's Mill is now a holiday cottage. It retains a waterwheel, three grinding stones set into a floor, and the original apple-wood cogs and gearing encased in glass.

Public Services

The village has an inn called the White Horse Inn which doubles up as a post office. King's Meaburn used to have a school until it closed down in 1983.

See also

Listed buildings in King's Meaburn

References

Further reading
Addison, Caroline & Addison, Margaret, King's Meaburn Through the Ages

External links
Cumbria County History Trust: King's Meaburn (nb: provisional research only – see Talk page)
The King's Meaburn Visit Cumbria page
King's Meaburn page on "Mauldy" site

Villages in Cumbria
Civil parishes in Cumbria